Cecrops (Kékrops; gen.: Κέκροπος) was a mythical king of Attica which derived from him its name Cecropia, having previously borne the name of Acte or Actice (from Actaeus). He was the founder and the first king of Athens itself though preceded in the region by the earth-born king Actaeus of Attica. Cecrops was a culture hero, teaching the Athenians marriage, reading and writing, and ceremonial burial.

Etymology and form 
The name of Cecrops is not of Greek origin according to Strabo. It was said that he was born from the earth itself (an autochthon) and was accordingly called a γηγενής (gēgenḗs "native"), and described as having his top half shaped like a man and the bottom half in serpent or fish-tail form. Hence he was called διφυής (diphuḗs, "of two natures"). Diodorus rationalized that his double form was because of his double citizenship, Greek and barbarian. Some ancients referred the epithet διφυής to marriage, of which tradition made him the founder.

Family 
Apparently Cecrops married Aglaurus, the daughter of Actaeus, former king of the region of Attica, whom he succeeded on the throne.  It is disputed that this woman was the mother of Cecrops's son Erysichthon.  Erysichthon predeceased him, and he was succeeded by Cranaus, who is said to have been one of the wealthiest citizens of Athens at that time. 

Cecrops was the father of three daughters: Herse, Pandrosus and Aglaurus. To them was given a box or jar containing the infant Erichthonius to guard unseen. They looked and, terrified by the two serpents Athena had set within to guard the child, they fled in terror and leapt from the Acropolis to their deaths. Some accounts say one of the sisters was turned to stone instead.

Mythology

Preserved knowledge
The myth preserves the tribal names of some of the prehistoric inhabitants of Attica: Kaukônes (/Kékrops, Akhaioi (/Ἀktaῖos and Kranaoi/(( ’’Kranaos’’)), and has an  Indo-Europeanreference to inhabitants called ágraulos ( (literally “living outdoors”).

Culture hero 
Cecrops was represented in the Attic legends as the author of the first elements of civilized life such as marriage, the political division of Attica into twelve communities, and also as the introducer of a new mode of worship. He was said to have been the first who deified Zeus, and ordained sacrifices to be offered to him as the supreme Deity. Cecrops was likewise affirmed to have been the first who built altars and statues of the gods, offered sacrifices, and instituted marriage among the Athenians, who, before his time, it seems, lived promiscuously. Pausanias tells us that he forbade the sacrificing of any living creatures to the gods, as well as any sort of other offering, only allowing cakes (πέλανοι) formed into the shape of an ox with horns, called by the Athenians Pelanous, which signifies an ox. He is likewise said to have taught his subjects the art of navigation; and, for the better administration of justice and intercourse among them, to have divided them into the four tribes called Cecropis, Autochthon, Actea, and Paralia. Some likewise make him the founder of the areopagus.

The Acropolis was also known as the Cecropia in his honor. The Athenians are said to have called themselves Cecropidæ, during the reigns of the five following kings, in his honor.

Patronage of Athens 
During his reign which lasted for 50 years,  the gods resolved to take possession of cities in which each of them should receive their own peculiar worship. Athena became the patron goddess of the city of Athens in a competition with Poseidon, as judged by Cecrops. The two raced ferociously towards the Acropolis and it was a very close race. Poseidon was the first to reach Attica and struck the acropolis with his trident and thereby created a salt sea which was known in later times by the name of the Erechthean well, from its being enclosed in the temple of Erechtheus. After him, Athena arrived and called on Cecrops to witness her act of taking possession. She planted an olive tree on the hill of the acropolis, which continued to be shown in the Pandrosium down to the latest times. But when the two gods continued to strive for possession of the country, Zeus parted them and appointed arbiters - not, as some have affirmed, Cecrops and Cranaus, nor Erysichthon, but the twelve gods. And in accordance with their verdict the country was adjudged to Athena, because Cecrops bore witness that she had been the first to plant the olive. Athena, therefore, called the city Athens after herself. Poseidon in hot anger flooded the Thriasian plain and laid Attica under the sea.

A rationalistic explanation of the fable was propounded by the eminent Roman antiquary Varro. According to him, the olive-tree suddenly appeared in Attica, and at the same time there was an eruption of water in another part of the country. So king Cecrops sent to inquire of Apollo at Delphi what these portents might signify. The oracle answered that the olive and the water were the symbols of Athena and Poseidon respectively, and that the people of Attica were free to choose which of these deities they would worship. Accordingly, the question was submitted to a general assembly of the citizens and citizenesses; for in these days women had the vote as well as men. All the men voted for the god, and all the women voted for the goddess; and as there was one more woman than there were men, the goddess appeared at the head of the poll. Chagrined at the loss of the election, Poseidon flooded the country with the water of the sea, and to appease his wrath it was decided to deprive women of the vote and to forbid children to bear their mother's names for the future.

The Athenians said that the contest between Poseidon and Athena took place on the second of the month Boedromion, and hence they omitted that day from the calendar.

Multiple Cecrops 
The name of Cecrops occurs also in other parts of Greece, especially where there existed a town named Athenae, such as in Boeotia, where he is said to have founded the ancient towns of Athenae and Eleusis on the Triton River, and where he had a heroön at Haliartus. Tradition there called him a son of Pandion. In Euboea, which also had a town named Athenae, Cecrops was called a son of Erechtheus and Praxithea, and a grandson of Pandion. From these traditions it appears, that Cecrops must be regarded as a hero of the Pelasgian race; and Müller justly remarks, that the different mythical personages of this name connected with the towns in Boeotia and Euboea are only multiplications of the one original hero, whose name and story were transplanted from Attica to other places. The later Greek writers describe Cecrops as having immigrated into Greece with a band of colonists from Sais in Egypt. But this account is not only rejected by some of the ancients themselves, but by the ablest critics of modern times.

See also

 Cecropia
 Phrygia
 Fuxi
 Nüwa

Notes

References 

 Antoninus Liberalis, The Metamorphoses of Antoninus Liberalis translated by Francis Celoria (Routledge 1992). Online version at the Topos Text Project.
Burkert, W. Structure and History in Greek Mythology and Ritual (Baltimore, 1993)
Diodorus Siculus, The Library of History translated by Charles Henry Oldfather. Twelve volumes. Loeb Classical Library. Cambridge, Massachusetts: Harvard University Press; London: William Heinemann, Ltd. 1989. Vol. 3. Books 4.59–8. Online version at Bill Thayer's Web Site
Diodorus Siculus, Bibliotheca Historica. Vol 1-2. Immanel Bekker. Ludwig Dindorf. Friedrich Vogel. in aedibus B. G. Teubneri. Leipzig. 1888–1890. Greek text available at the Perseus Digital Library.
Euripides, The Complete Greek Drama, edited by Whitney J. Oates and Eugene O'Neill, Jr. in two volumes. 1. Ion, translated by Robert Potter. New York. Random House. 1938. Online version at the Perseus Digital Library.
Euripides, Euripidis Fabulae. vol. 2. Gilbert Murray. Oxford. Clarendon Press, Oxford. 1913. Greek text available at the Perseus Digital Library.
Gaius Julius Hyginus, Fabulae from The Myths of Hyginus translated and edited by Mary Grant. University of Kansas Publications in Humanistic Studies. Online version at the Topos Text Project.
Herodotus, The Histories with an English translation by A. D. Godley. Cambridge. Harvard University Press. 1920. Online version at the Topos Text Project. Greek text available at Perseus Digital Library.
John Tzetzes, Book of Histories, Book V-VI translated by Konstantinos Ramiotis from the original Greek of T. Kiessling's edition of 1826.  Online version at theio.com.
Pausanias, Description of Greece with an English Translation by W.H.S. Jones, Litt.D., and H.A. Ormerod, M.A., in 4 Volumes. Cambridge, MA, Harvard University Press; London, William Heinemann Ltd. 1918. Online version at the Perseus Digital Library  Pausanias, Graeciae Descriptio. 3 vols. Leipzig, Teubner. 1903.  Greek text available at the Perseus Digital Library.
Pseudo-Apollodorus, The Library with an English Translation by Sir James George Frazer, F.B.A., F.R.S. in 2 Volumes, Cambridge, MA, Harvard University Press; London, William Heinemann Ltd. 1921. Online version at the Perseus Digital Library. Greek text available from the same website.
Publius Ovidius Naso, Metamorphoses translated by Brookes More (1859-1942). Boston, Cornhill Publishing Co. 1922. Online version at the Perseus Digital Library.  Publius Ovidius Naso, Metamorphoses. Hugo Magnus. Gotha (Germany). Friedr. Andr. Perthes. 1892. Latin text available at the Perseus Digital Library.
Smith, William; Dictionary of Greek and Roman Biography and Mythology, London (1873). "Cecrops"
Strabo, The Geography of Strabo. Edition by H.L. Jones. Cambridge, Mass.: Harvard University Press; London: William Heinemann, Ltd. 1924. Online version at the Perseus Digital Library.
Strabo, Geographica edited by A. Meineke. Leipzig: Teubner. 1877. Greek text available at the Perseus Digital Library.

Greek dragons
Greek mythological heroes
Mythological hybrids
Autochthons of classical mythology
Kings of Athens
Kings in Greek mythology
Metamorphoses characters
Attican characters in Greek mythology
Deeds of Athena
Deeds of Poseidon